Sarpsborg ( or ), historically Borg, is a city and municipality in Viken county, Norway.  The administrative centre of the municipality is the city of Sarpsborg.

Sarpsborg is part of the fifth largest urban area in Norway when paired with neighbouring Fredrikstad. As of 1 January 2018, according to Statistics Norway these two municipalities have a total population of 136,127 with  55,840 in Sarpsborg and 81,278 in Fredrikstad.

Borregaard Industries is, and always has been, the most important industry in the city. The city is also the home of Borg Bryggerier, part of the Hansa Borg Bryggerier, which is Norway's second largest brewery-group.

General information

Name

In Norse times the city was just called Borg (from borg which means "castle"). The background for this was the fortification built by Olav Haraldsson (see History section).  Later the genitive case of the name of the waterfall Sarpr (Sarp Falls) was added, it's unclear how Sarpsborg received this part of its name, two interpretations are the most prevalent. The first coming from the Icelandic word Sarpr which means birdcage in English. The other interpretation is that Sarpr means "the one who swallows", probably referring to the local waterfall.

In Norse times Østfold county was called Borgarsýsla which means "the county (sýsla) of Borg" and the law district of southeast Norway was called Borgarþing meaning "the thing/court of Borg".

The old name has been revived in the diocese of Borg (1968) and Borgarting Court of Appeal (1995).

Coat of arms
The coat-of-arms is from modern times and was granted on 13 November 1991.  It is based on a coat of arms dating from 1556 and shows a bear above a castle. The bear was introduced as early as some time in the 13th century, by the earl of Sarpsborg (Comes de Saresburgh), Alv Erlingsson. He used the bear to symbolise his strength. The castle symbolises the fortress (borg) that gave the city its original name.

History

The city was founded as Borg by the Viking King Olav Haraldsson (Saint Olaf) in 1016. It was burned to the ground by Swedish invaders in 1567 during the Northern Seven Years' War.

Much of the rebuilt town disappeared into the river Glomma during a 1702 mudslide. Again Borg was rebuilt, and it was recreated as a city in 1839, and separated from Tune as a municipality of its own.

The rural municipalities of Tune, Skjeberg, and Varteig were merged with the city on 1 January 1992. The population is steadily growing, and during the summer of 2005 it reached 50,000 inhabitants.

In 2016 the town celebrated its 1,000th anniversary, and the entire year was commemorated by a special programme that encouraged historic preservation within the town.

Historically, the sawmill and timber shipping industry has been Sarpsborg's most important sources of income, however since the industrialisation in Norway, more specifically Sarpsborg and the establishment of local manufacturing businesses during the late 1800s, the biggest being Borregaard, Sarpsborg has changed from its traditional timber-based economy and pre-industrial society to a more manufacturing and refining-based economy and industrial society. In modern times Sarpsborg has moved away from being a city based on the local manufacturing and refining industry, with only around ten percent employed within the local manufacturing industry, coinciding with Norway's general shift towards a post-industrial society. Despite this, the city is still widely regarded by Norwegians both unofficially and officially, to be an industrial city.

City districts

Sport
During the 1950s and 1960s, Sarpsborg was famous for its football (soccer) team, Sarpsborg FK, but is now more known for its ice hockey team, Sparta Warriors. In football, Sarpsborg 08 FF has taken over the local throne, currently playing at the highest national level. On 6 November 2009, they sent arch-rival FFK down from the top division in a play-off game in Fredrikstad stadion. Sarpsborg 08 has a women's football team that was promoted to the women's Division 1 at the end of 2011, at the same time as the club's under-19 girls reached the Junior Cup Final.  Sarpsborg BK plays in the highest bandy division.

Sarpsborg is famous for its two elite leagues teams in floorball, Sarpsborg IBK and Greåker IBK.

Climate
The all-time high  was recorded in July 2018. The all-time low  was set in December 2002. Since the weather station was incepted in 1991, the records may not be representative of a longer time frame. The average date for the last overnight freeze (low below ) in spring is 20 April and average date for first freeze in autumn is 22 October giving a frost-free season of 184 days (1981-2010 average).

Musical artists and bands

Notable residents

Public service 
 Zacharias Mellebye (1781 in Skjeberg – 1854) farmer, military officer and rep. at the Norwegian Constituent Assembly
 Harald Dahl (1863–1920), father of the British writer Roald Dahl came from Sarpsborg
 Roald Amundsen (1872-1928) explorer, first person to reach the South Pole, came from Borge 
 Oscar Torp (1893 in Skjeberg – 1958) former Prime Minister of Norway, 1951-1955
 Carl Fredrik Wisløff (1908–2004) theologian and Christian preacher, grew up in Sarpsborg
 Øistein Strømnæs (1914 in Sarpsborg – 1980) head of XU, the WWII intelligence organization
 Torbjørn Sikkeland (1923 in Varteig – 2014) chemist, nuclear physicist and radiation biophysicist
 Thorvald Gressum (1932–2008) a politician and Mayor of Sarpsborg 1984 to 1995
 Kai Eide (born 1949 in Sarpsborg) a diplomat and writer; roles with the United Nations
 Erik Varden (born 1974), a Roman Catholic spiritual writer and Bishop-Prelate of Trondheim

The Arts 

 Julius Fritzner (1828 in Skjeberg – 1882) a restaurateur and hotelier in Christiania
 Bjarne Bø (1907 in Skjeberg – 1998) a Norwegian actor 
 Arne Arnardo, (1912 in Sarpsborg – 1995) circus performer and owner, "Circus King of Norway"
 Walther Aas, (Norwegian Wiki) (1928–1990), neo-romantic artist; lived in Sarpsborg from 1954
 Kjell Karlsen (1931 in Sarpsborg – 2020) band leader, composer, jazz pianist and organist
 Nils Ole Oftebro (born 1944 in Sarpsborg) a Norwegian actor and illustrator 
 Jan Groth (born 1946 in Greåker) vocalist, songwriter, artist with Aunt Mary and other bands
 Ketil Gudim (born 1956 in Sarpsborg) a Norwegian dancer and actor  
 Einstein Kristiansen (born 1965 in Greåker) a cartoonist, designer and TV-host 
 Kåre Christoffer Vestrheim (born 1969 in Sarpsborg) record producer, musician and composer
 Stian Johansen (born 1971 in Sarpsborg) stage name Occultus, black metal musician
 Stephan Groth (born 1971) musician with Apoptygma Berzerk; lived in Sarpsborg since 1986
 Jasmin Haugstuen Please (born 1988) actress 
 Ulrikke Brandstorp (born 1995 in Sarpsborg) singer, songwriter and musical actress

Sport 
 Therese Bertheau (1861 in Skjeberg – 1936) a pioneering female Norwegian mountaineer
 John Anderson (1873 in Sarpsborg – 1949) US Major League Baseball player for 15 seasons
 Bjørn Spydevold (1918 in Sarpsborg – 2002) a footballer with 37 caps for Norway 
 Bent Skammelsrud (born 1966 in Sarpsborg) footballer, with 366 club caps, mainly for Rosenborg BK and 38 for Norway 
 Thomas Myhre (born 1973 in Sarpsborg) goalkeeper with 346 club caps and 56 for Norway 
 Raymond Kvisvik (born 1974 in Sarpsborg) footballer, with 425 club caps and 11 for Norway 
 Jens Arne Svartedal (born 1976 in Sarpsborg), cross-country skier, team silver medallist at the 2006 Winter Olympics
 Per-Åge Skrøder (born 1978 in Sarpsborg), ice hockey player with men's national team
 Marianne Skarpnord (born 1986 in Sarpsborg) pro. golfer, plays on Ladies European Tour
 Jonas Holøs (born 1987 in Sarpsborg), ice hockey player with men's national team
 Marie Solberg (born 1988 in Sarpsborg) a sailor, bronze medallist at the 2012 Summer Paralympics
 Sander Skogli (born 1993 in Sarpsborg), ice hockey player

Twin towns - Sister cities

Sarpsborg has several sister cities:

References

External links

 
Cities and towns in Norway
Municipalities of Østfold
Municipalities of Viken (county)
Populated places on the Glomma River